Google Tensor is a series of ARM64-based  system-on-chip (SoC) processors designed by Google for its Pixel devices. The first-generation chip debuted on the Pixel 6 smartphone series in 2021, and were succeeded by the second-generation chip on the Pixel 7 and Pixel 7 Pro smartphone series in 2022.

Background 
Conceptual development of a Google-designed system-on-chip (SoC) first began in April 2016, although Google CEO Sundar Pichai and hardware chief Rick Osterloh agreed it would likely take an extended period of time before the product was ready; Osterloh stated "about a year in, 2017, we decided we actually really needed to build an SoC, because you couldn't just build a single co-processor in order to really harness the full capabilities we needed across a diverse set of AI models and approaches" and Pichai agreed, adding that "[Google] have also tried to push the boundary with [Tensor Processing Units] custom-built for our AI services. I think it's important, recognizing that to do well here, particularly if you want to do it well from an AI standpoint, we need to evolve silicon with that focus." In 2017, the company assembled a team of 76 semiconductor researchers, specializing in artificial intelligence and machine learning, which has since increased in size, to work on the chip.

Starting with the Pixel 2 line released in 2017, Google began to include custom-developed coprocessors in its flagship Pixel smartphones: the Pixel Visual Core (Pixel 2 and 3) and Pixel Neural Core (Pixel 4) were intended to offload specific tasks from the main processor; the Visual Core served as a coprocessor for computational imaging tasks including multi-exposure high-dynamic-range (HDR) photography and the Neural Core was intended to handle more general machine learning tasks, including computational images and voice processing for Google Assistant.

By April 2020, the company had made "significant progress" toward a custom ARM-based processor for its Pixel and Chromebook devices, codenamed "Whitechapel". At Google parent company Alphabet Inc.'s quarterly earnings investor call that October, Pichai expressed excitement at the company's "deeper investments" in hardware, which some interpreted as an allusion to Whitechapel. The Neural Core was not included in the flagship Pixel 5, shipped in fall 2020; Google stated the camera performance was "similar" to the Pixel 4 using the Pixel 5's Snapdragon 765G chipset, which includes a Qualcomm Hexagon digital signal processor for voice and a computer vision image signal processor. It had been confirmed previously that Whitechapel would not be ready in time to implement into the Pixel 5, as engineering samples had been received by Google in Spring 2020; In April 2021, it was reported that Whitechapel would power Google's next Pixel smartphones.

Google officially unveiled the chip, named Tensor, in August, as part of a preview of its Pixel 6 and Pixel 6 Pro smartphones. Previous Pixel smartphones had used Qualcomm Snapdragon chips, with 2021's Pixel 5a being the final Pixel phone to do so. Pichai later obliquely noted the development of Tensor and the Pixel 6 resulted in more off-the-shelf solutions for the 2020 and early 2021 Pixel smartphones: "Part of the reason that I think the team has been more modest in their approach with Pixel over the past 18 months or so is because they’ve been waiting for Tensor to time our investments this way."

In September 2022, The Verge reported that a Tensor-powered successor to the Pixelbook laptop with a planned 2023 release had been canceled due to cost-cutting measures.

Design
"Tensor" is a reference to Google's TensorFlow and Tensor Processing Unit technologies, and the chip is developed by the Google Silicon team housed within the company's hardware division, led by vice president and general manager Phil Carmack alongside senior director Monika Gupta, in conjunction with the Google Research division.

The Tensor chip architecture has been called an "unusual" octa-core arrangement, using two "large" cores, two "medium" cores, and four "small" cores; typical octa-core SoCs use one "large", three "medium", and four "small" cores to optimize single-threaded workloads. According to Carmack, the Tensor architecture is intended instead to be efficient at medium workloads, such as a live view of camera output, by running both "large" cores simultaneously at a low frequency to manage the various coprocessors, while competing architectures would manage them with the "medium" cores at full frequency.

Osterloh has stated that Tensor's performance is difficult to quantify using synthetic benchmarks, but should be characterized by the capabilities it enables instead, giving an example using speech recognition: "[Tensor] does make things possible that weren't possible before. For instance, on Tensor and Pixel 6, the speech recognizer is out of this world. We took a lot of engineering efforts to move our data center quality models, make them run on-device using the TPU. It wasn't possible before Tensor. And what you get out of it is something that can recognize words at 200 words a minute. I mean, it can go faster than I can think." Other machine learning features enabled by Tensor at the time it was launched include real-time language translation, the ability to un-blur photographs, and HDR-like processing on each frame of a video.

Models

First-generation 
The first-generation Tensor chip debuted on the Pixel 6 and Pixel 6 Pro, which were officially announced in October 2021 at the Pixel Fall Launch event. It was later reused for the Pixel 6a, a mid-range variant of the Pixel 6 series which was announced in July 2022. Despite being marketed as developed by Google, close-up examinations revealed that the chip contains numerous similarities with Samsung's Exynos series.

Second-generation 
A second-generation Tensor chip was in development by October 2021. At the annual Google I/O keynote in July 2022, Google announced that the chip would debut on the Pixel 7 and Pixel 7 Pro smartphones, which were officially announced on October 6 at the annual Made by Google event. The chip is marketed as "Google Tensor G2".

Reception 
The first-generation Tensor chip was positively received. Philip Michaels of Tom's Guide praised the Pixel 6 and Pixel 6 Pro's Tensor-powered features and video enhancements, as did Marques Brownlee and Wired Julian Chokkattu. His colleague Lily Hay Newman also highlighted the chip's security capabilities, declaring them Tensor's strongest selling point. Jacon Krol of CNN Underscored wrote that Tensor delivered "some of the most fluid and fastest performance" on a smartphone, though Android Authority Jimmy Westenberg was ambivalent. Ryne Hager of Android Police thought the chip's performance was acceptable to the everyday user, but was disappointed that Google did not offer more years of Android updates given it was no longer bound by Qualcomm's contractual terms. TechRadar reviewer James Peckham commended Tensor as a "standout feature", though his colleague David Lumb described the chip's performance as "strong but not class-leading".

See also 
 Apple silicon

References 

ARM-based systems on chips
Computer-related introductions in 2021
Google hardware